Lemon Tree Passage is a 2014 Australian horror/thriller film that was directed by David James Campbell and is his feature film directorial debut. The film received an Australian release and stars Andrew Ryan, Tim Phillipps, Pippa Black, Jessica Tovey, and Tim Pocock as a group of backpackers that find themselves in the midst of strange occurrences. The movie's premise is based upon an urban legend that claims that if a motorist speeds along Lemon Tree Passage Road in Lemon Tree Passage, New South Wales, they will see a ghost.

Plot

Oscar (Andrew Ryan) and Geordie (Tim Phillipps) are two Australian friends who decide to take a group of American backpackers, Amelia (Pippa Black), Maya (Jessica Tovey), and her brother Toby (Tim Pocock), home with them. Oscar is keen on scoring with the beautiful Amelia while the shy Geordie finds himself becoming attracted to Maya. As the night progresses the Americans are introduced to Geordie's brother Sam (Nicholas Gunn), and Maya begins to suffer terrible nightmares. The group ultimately decides to try to summon the ghost of Lemon Tree Passage, only to find that this spurs on more strange occurrences.

Cast
Jessica Tovey as Maya
Nicholas Gunn as Sam
Pippa Black as Amelia
Tim Phillipps as Geordie
Andrew Ryan as Oscar
Tim Pocock as Toby
Piéra Forde as Brianna

Production
Lemon Tree Passage was inspired by an urban legend surrounding a road by the same name in Port Stephens, which was the focus of a segment aired on Today Tonight in 2010. Director Campbell penned the script with Erica Brien and the bulk of the film's footage was shot in South Australia during September 2012. Additional footage, which included the addition of another character, was shot in March 2014. Financing for the film was raised privately.

Reception
ScreenRelish gave a mixed review for Lemon Tree Passage, panning the film overall and stating that it was "a film that wants to send shivers down your spine (and certainly the promotional artwork does that in spades), but your brain is too preoccupied trying to figure out what’s going on, that it ultimately proves to be a somewhat dissatisfying experience." SBS wrote that while Campbell "[pulled] his weight" as a director, the film's script was flawed and that it was overall uneven.

References

External links
 

2014 films
2014 horror films
Australian horror thriller films
Films shot in Australia
2014 horror thriller films
2010s English-language films